The names Ahhotep may refer to:

 Ahhotep I (c. 1560 – 1530 BCE), Ancient Egyptian queen who lived during the 17th dynasty
 Ahhotep II, believed to have been the wife of ancient Egyptian pharaoh Kamose, who reigned 1526–1506 BCE

Ancient Egyptian given names
Theophoric names
Feminine given names